Patricia Moreno Sánchez (born January 7, 1988 in Madrid) is a Spanish former artistic gymnast. Moreno began gymnastics in 1995 and admired Romanian Simona Amânar. Her best event was floor exercise.

Career

Junior career
In 2002, Moreno competed at the 2002 Junior European Championships. Here she placed 14th in the all-around and 4th in the floor exercise final.

Senior career
Moreno became a senior gymnast in 2003. Moreno competed at the 2003 World Championships in Anaheim, California.  Here she and the Spanish team placed 5th in the team final, therefore qualifying a full team to the 2004 Olympics. Individually, she placed 22nd in the all around competition. In 2004, Moreno was named to the 2004 Olympic team, where the team placed 5th. Individually, Moreno won Spanish women's artistic gymnastics' first ever Olympic medal in Athens, where she was third on floor with score of 9.487. During the Olympics, Moreno also debuted a 3 and a 1/2 twist on floor, a move which is now named after her. Moreno has also trained a quadruple twist, though it was never performed internationally.

Following the 2004 Olympics, Moreno continued to compete. Moreno competed at the 2005 American Cup. Here she won a gold medal on the floor exercise and placed 7th on balance beam. Moreno missed the majority of the 2005 season with an injury sustained at the 2005 European Championships in Debrecen, Hungary but continued to compete in 2006. Moreno  struggled to regain her Olympic form following the injury. She appeared at the 2006 European Championships in Volos, Greece. Here, Moreno and the Spanish team placed 4th; Moreno only competed on floor exercise. At the 2006 World Championships in Aarhus, Denmark. Here, the team placed 8th. she was a reserve for the floor exercise finals. Moreno competed at the 2007 European Championships in Amsterdam, where she qualified to the all-around and floor exercise finals, where she placed 15th and 7th respectively. Moreno was selected for the Spanish team to compete at the 2007 World Championships in Stuttgart, Germany, however she injured herself on the balance beam in qualifications and was unable to continue the competition. Moreno's final international competition was the 2008 City of Jesolo Trophy, where the Spanish team earned a bronze medal.

Floor Music
2003: "Welcome to Cuba" from Die Another Day

2004-2005: "Guapa" by Cafe de Miami

2006-2007: "Palladio" by Escala

See also
List of Olympic female gymnasts for Spain

References

External links
 
 
 
 

1988 births
Living people
Spanish female artistic gymnasts
Gymnasts at the 2004 Summer Olympics
Olympic gymnasts of Spain
Olympic bronze medalists for Spain
Olympic medalists in gymnastics
Gymnasts from Madrid
Medalists at the 2004 Summer Olympics
21st-century Spanish women